Vladimir Grabinsky (born 15 January 1974, in Lviv) is a Ukrainian chess International Master and coach of the Ukrainian youth team. Enrolled in the Lviv Institute of Physical Culture in 1990 and graduated in 1994. Twelve of his students became Grandmasters at an early age; these are: Andrei Volokitin, Yuriy Kryvoruchko, Martyn Kravtsiv, Yaroslav Zherebukh, Yuri Vovk, Andrey Vovk, Mikhailo Oleksienko, Nataliya Buksa, Vita Kryvoruchko, Myroslava Hrabinska and Kateryna Matseyko.

In 2009 Grabinsky was awarded the title of FIDE Senior Trainer.

Assessment and personality
In his book For Friends & Colleagues Volume II: Reflections on My Profession, Mark Dvoretsky described "There is an excellent trainer Vladimir Grabinsky in Lvov, who has brought up a number of leading Ukrainian young players. Some of them are grandmasters now, the most well-known being Andrey Volokitin. Grabinsky’s approach to chess is not dissimilar to my own. We had a nice talk discussing various training problems. In most cases, our opinions were the same, though we had our differences too. I felt from the very start that I was talking to a professional of the highest level."

In book Dynamic Decision Making in Chess Boris Gelfand described "Grabinsky is a world-class trainer who has worked with close to ten players from their early years until 2650 level."

Books
Andrei Volokitin, Vladimir Grabinsky, Perfect Your Chess (Gambit, 2007) 
Władimir Grabinski, Andriej Wołokitin, Laboratorium Arcymistrza (Penelopa, 2007) 
Andrei Volokitin, Vladimir Grabinsky, Allenamento intensivo di livello superiore  (Prisma Editori, 2008) 
Andrej Wolokitin, Wladimir Grabinski, PERFEKTIONIEREN SIE IHR SCHACH  (Gambit, 2008)

Notable games
Vladimir Grabinsky vs Alexander Potapov, Czech Open 2005, Scotch Game: Gцring Gambit (C44), 1–0

References

External links
Personal site of Vladimir Grabinsky and his students Constantly updated website on chess life in Lviv with exclusive photos, interviews and games. There is also a Russian version.

ICC notes

Vladimir Grabinsky at 365Chess.com

1974 births
Living people
Ukrainian chess players
Chess International Masters
Ukrainian chess writers
Sportspeople from Lviv
Chess coaches